Louis Thomas Reynolds (1872 – December 1948) was an American Negro league first baseman in the 1890s.

A native of Frankford, Missouri, Reynolds attended Hedding College and played for the school's baseball team. In 1897 and 1899, he played for the Chicago Unions. In 11 recorded career games with Chicago, he posted 21 hits with two home runs and 11 RBI in 49 plate appearances. He died in Kewanee, Illinois in 1948 at age 75 or 76.

References

External links
Baseball statistics and player information from Seamheads

1872 births
1948 deaths
Date of birth missing
Date of death missing
Chicago Unions players
Baseball first basemen
Baseball players from Missouri
People from Pike County, Missouri